The Junction Public House, also known as The Junction Pub and most often abridged as The Junction, is a gay bar and nightclub in Davie Village, Vancouver, British Columbia. The club was formerly known as Pulse.

Description
The Junction is a gay bar and nightclub located at 1138 Davie Street in Vancouver's Davie Village. According to the Canadian LGBT-focused online magazine Daily Xtra, the club welcomes straight people. Its website says, "Expect to get down with those that are straight — not narrow." Vince Marino co-owns The Junction and Pumpjack Pub, another gay bar.

Reception
In 2014, Out Traveler Jase Peeples wrote, "Whether you’re watching a hilarious drag show, enjoying a sexy striptease, or just spending a low-key afternoon on the front patio as you enjoy daily drink specials and a few tasty appetizers from the kitchen, the Junction is a must-hit stop for any trip over the Canadian rainbow." The Junction topped Queerty's list of "7 Great Canadian Gay Watering Holes to Add to Your Bucket List".

References

External links

 

LGBT culture in Vancouver
LGBT nightclubs in Canada
Nightclubs in Vancouver
West End, Vancouver